The men's 100 metres at the 2014 World Junior Championships in Athletics was held at Hayward Field on 22 and 23 July.

Medalists

Records

Results

Heats
Qualification: Best 3 (Q) and next 3 fastest (q) qualify for the next round.

Wind:

Heat 1: +0.4 m/s, Heat 2: +1.4 m/s, Heat 3: +1.0 m/s, Heat 4: −0.2 m/s, Heat 5: +1.1 m/s, Heat 6: +0.7 m/s, Heat 7: −0.5 m/s

Semifinals
Qualification: Best 2 (Q) and next 2 fastest (q) qualify for the next round.

Wind:

Heat 1: 0.0 m/s, Heat 2: −0.3 m/s, Heat 3: -1.6 m/s

Final
The final was started at 20:50

Wind −0.6

References

External links
 WJC14 100 metres schedule

100 metres
100 metres at the World Athletics U20 Championships